White Hall is an unincorporated community in Bell County, in the U.S. state of Texas. According to the Handbook of Texas, the community had a population of 45 in 2000. It is located within the Killeen-Temple-Fort Hood metropolitan area.

History
The area in what is now known as White Hall today was first settled sometime before 1856 when a Masonic lodge was built in the community. There were 25 people supported by five businesses in 1933. It grew to have 32 families that were a mixture of Anglo and German American farmers. Businesses in White Hall included a gas station, a gin, a store, a Methodist church, and a Church of Christ in 1946. Its population was 45 from 1964 through 2000.

Geography

Education
In 1903, White Hall had a school with 23 students enrolled. Today, the community is served by the Moody Independent School District.

References

Unincorporated communities in Texas
Unincorporated communities in Bell County, Texas